The Birth of the Virgin is an oil on canvas painting by Annibale Carracci, commissioned by Cesare d'Este in 1605 but still incomplete in the artist's studio upon his death in 1609. It hung in one of the chapels in the Loreto Basilica from 1628 to 1633 and was looted by Napoleon's troops in 1797, entering the Louvre the following year, in whose collection it remains.

References

Carracci
1600s paintings
Paintings in the Louvre by Italian artists
Paintings by Annibale Carracci